Michael Feinstein Sings the Jule Styne Songbook is a 1991 album by American vocalist Michael Feinstein of songs written by Jule Styne.

Track listing

All music composed by Jule Styne, lyricists indicated.

Personnel
Michael Feinstein - vocals
Jule Styne - piano

References

Elektra Records albums
Michael Feinstein albums
1991 albums